West High School is a public high school located in West, Texas (USA) and classified as a 3A school by the UIL. It is part of the West Independent School District located in northern McLennan County. In 2015, the school was rated "Met Standard" by the Texas Education Agency.

The campus was heavily damaged in the April 2013 West Fertilizer Company explosion and demolition of the school building began in mid-December 2013. Classes were held at a temporary site until the new West High School campus opened in 2015.

Athletics
The West Trojans compete in these sports 

Baseball
Basketball
Cross Country
Football
Powerlifting
Softball
Track and Field
Volleyball

State Titles
West (UIL)

Baseball - 
1999(3A), 2015(3A), 2016(3A)
Softball - 
2016(3A)
Girls Basketball - 
1963(2A)

West Dunbar (PVIL)

Football - 
1959(PVIL-1A)
Boys Track - 
1953(PVIL-1A)
Girls Track - 
1957(PVIL-1A)

Notable alumni
 Scott Podsednik (class of 1994), major league baseball player (2001-2012); outfielder for 2005 World Champion Chicago White Sox.

References

External links
West ISD

Schools in McLennan County, Texas
Public high schools in Texas
West, Texas